Calvary Baptist Church may refer to:

Antarctica
Calvary Baptist Church (British Antarctic Territory)

United Kingdom 
 Calvary Baptist Church (Belfast)

United States 
(by state)
 Calvary Baptist Church (Washington, D.C.)
 First Baptist Church (Davenport, Iowa), also known as Calvary Baptist Church, listed on the NRHP in Iowa
Cavalry Baptist Church (Bradenton, Florida)
 Calvary Baptist Church (Wichita, Kansas), listed on the NRHP in Kansas
 Calvary Baptist Church (Roseville, Minnesota)
 Calvary Baptist Church (Jackson, Mississippi), listed on the NRHP in Mississippi
 Calvary Baptist Church (Tupelo, Mississippi)
 Calvary Baptist Church (Ocean View, New Jersey), listed on the NRHP in New Jersey
 Calvary Baptist Church (Manhattan)
 Calvary Baptist Church (Ossining, New York), listed on the NRHP in New York as St. Paul's Episcopal Church and Rectory (its original name)
 Calvary Baptist Church (Oklahoma City), listed on the NRHP in Oklahoma
 Calvary Baptist Church (Salem, OR)
 Calvary Baptist Church (Chester, Pennsylvania)
 Calvary Baptist Church (Providence, Rhode Island), listed on the NRHP in Rhode Island
 Calvary Baptist Church (Longview, WA)
 Cavalry Baptist Church (Spokane, Washington), established by Peter Barnabas Barrow and others
 Calvary Baptist Church (Staunton, VA)
Calvary Baptist Church (King, NC)
Calvary Baptist Church (Charleston/Claremont, NH)